Silver Bear(s) may refer to:

Silver Bear (Silberner Bär), a group of awards given in various categories at the Berlin International Film Festival
Silver Bear ammunition, a brand of ammunition cartridges manufactured by Barnaul Cartridge Plant in Russia
Silver Bears, a 1978 British comedy crime thriller film